Palpita hollowayi is a moth in the family Crambidae. It was described by Inoue in 1997. It is found in New Caledonia.

References

Moths described in 1997
Palpita
Moths of Oceania